First published in 1956, The Drunken Forest is an account of a six-month trip Gerald Durrell made with his wife Jacquie to South America (Argentina and Paraguay) in 1954.

References

Books by Gerald Durrell
1956 non-fiction books
Books about Argentina
Books about Paraguay
1954 in Argentina
1954 in Paraguay
Rupert Hart-Davis books